Thomas Heeney (18 May 1898 – 15 June 1984) was a professional heavyweight boxer from New Zealand, best known for unsuccessfully challenging champion Gene Tunney for the heavyweight championship of the world in New York City on 26 July 1928.

Biography

Heeney was born in Gisborne, New Zealand, and worked as a plumber until he left New Zealand. He was a strong swimmer and was awarded a bronze medal by the Royal Humane Society of New Zealand in 1918 for helping rescue two women from the sea off Waikanae Beach, Gisborne. He also retrieved a third woman who did not survive.

He learnt to box from his father and his older brother Jack Heeney, who was the New Zealand amateur welterweight champion in 1914 and middleweight champion from 1919 to 1924. He became a professional boxer when he fought Bill Bartlett in Gisborne in 1920. In October 1920, Heeney became the New Zealand heavyweight champion when he beat Brian McCleary of Dunedin on a technical knockout. Heeney was also a rugby union player and played for the Hawke's Bay — Poverty Bay team against the Springboks in 1921. He boxed in Australia and won the Australian heavyweight champion title in 1922, and fought in England and South Africa in 1924.

Heeney went to the United States in 1926. He beat Jim Maloney, Johnny Risko and Jim Delaney and eventually ranked fourth among the world's heavyweight boxers.  After fighting Jack Sharkey, later a heavyweight world champion, in 1928 for the right to fight Tunney, on 26 July 1928, Heeney fought Gene Tunney at Yankee Stadium, New York City, for the world heavyweight championship title.  Heeney entered the boxing ring wearing a Māori cloak that was given to him by Heni Materoa, the widow of Sir James Carroll.  The referee, Ed Forbes, stopped the scheduled 15 round fight in the 11th round, and Tunney won.  It was said of Heeney:
His gritty performance in this fight would have been considered by many observers to have justified his sobriquet of The Hard Rock from Down Under given by renowned writer and journalist, Damon Runyon.

A week after his defeat, Tom married Marion Dunn, an American. Heeney became an American citizen and boxed until 1934, accomplishing a fighting record of 70 professional bouts, 38 wins, 22 losses, 8 draws, and 2 no-contest.

After retiring from boxing, he owned a bar in Miami, Florida. He served with the United States Navy Civil Engineer Corps in World War II, and afterward coached boxing and refereed armed forces bouts in the South Pacific. He often fished with his friend, the famous writer Ernest Hemingway.  Heeney's wife, Marion, died in 1980. They had no children.

Heeney was inducted into the New Zealand Sports Hall of Fame in 1996.

Professional boxing record
All information in this section is derived from BoxRec, unless otherwise stated.

Official record

All newspaper decisions are officially regarded as “no decision” bouts and are not counted in the win/loss/draw column.

Unofficial record

Record with the inclusion of newspaper decisions in the win/loss/draw column.

References

    5. Vogt, Anton: 'Tom Heeney in heaven,' New Zealand Listener, 14 October 1960

Further reading
From Poverty Bay to Broadway: The story of Tom Heeney by Lydia Monin (2008)
Kiwis With Gloves On by Brian F O'Brien, published 1960, Reed.

External links
 

1898 births
1984 deaths
New Zealand male boxers
American male boxers
New Zealand emigrants to the United States
New Zealand professional boxing champions
Sportspeople from Gisborne, New Zealand
Heavyweight boxers